Tamari Tatuashvili (born April 12, 1991) is a Georgian women's football defender currently playing in the Turkish Super League for Hakkarigücü Spor with jersey number 12. She is a member of the Georgian national team since 2009.

Club career 

Tamari Tatuashvili played for the clubs FC Norchi Dinamo Tbilisi, FC Iveria Khashuri and FC Dinamo Tbilisi. She enjoyed in the 2007–08 season the Georgian champion title with FC Dinamo Tbilisi. Later, she transferred to FC Baia Zugdidi, which became champion in the 2009–10 season. Following the dissolution of the Georgian women's league in 2010, she moved to Turkey, and signed with Lüleburgaz 39 Sporr to play in the 2011–12 Turkish Women's First Football League. The next season, she was transferred by Adana İdmanyurduspor. After appearing two full seasons and a half season for the Adana-based team, she moved in February 2015 to İlkadım Belediyesi Yabancılar Pazarı Spor in Samsun.

She debuted at the 2007–08 UEFA Women's Cup – Group A7 match as part of the team FC Dinamo Tbilisi against the Ukrainian Arsenal Kharkiv on August 9, 2007, and played in three games of the tournament. She appeared at the 2010–11 UEFA Women's Champions League – Group 5 playing for FC Baia Zugdidi. She participated in three qualifying round matches. She captained her team.

After her team was relegated to the Second League at the end of the 2017–18 season, she transferred to the newly promoted First League club Hakkarigücü Spor in October 2018.

In the |2022–23 Turkish Women's Super League season, she transferred to Trabzonspor..

International career 
Tamari Tatuashvili was called up to the Georgia women's under 17 team, and played her first match against the girls from England at the 2008 UEFA Women's Under-17 Championship – Group round on October 27, 2007. She capped three times in the tournament.

She became part of the Georgia women's national under-19 team, and played her first match against France at the 2010 UEFA Women's U-19 Championship First qualifying round – Group 7 on September 19, 2009. She took part in the games against Serbian and Turkish junior women in the same tournament.

Appearing in the Georgia women's national team, she participated at all eight of the 2011 FIFA Women's World Cup qualification – UEFA Group 3 matches against Denmark, Scotland, Bulgaria,  and Greece.

She played in three games of the UEFA Women's Euro 2013 qualifying – Group 2 appearing against Malta, Armenia, and Faroe Islands.

Tatuashvili participated at the 2015 FIFA Women's World Cup qualification – Group 2 matches against Lithuania, Montenegro, and Faroe Islands held in Lithuania in April 2013.

Career statistics 
.

Honours

Club 
 Georgia Championship
 FC Dinamo Tbilisi
 Winners (1): 2007–08

 FC Baia Zugdidi
 Winners (1): 2009–10

References 

1991 births
Living people
Footballers from Tbilisi
Georgia (country) women's international footballers
Women's association football defenders
Women's footballers from Georgia (country)
FC Dinamo Tbilisi players
FC Zugdidi players
Expatriate women's footballers from Georgia (country)
Expatriate women's footballers in Turkey
Expatriate sportspeople from Georgia (country) in Turkey
Lüleburgaz 39 Spor players
Adana İdmanyurduspor players
İlkadım Belediyespor players
Turkish Women's Football Super League players
Hakkarigücü Spor players
Trabzonspor women's players